Nervous Night is the second studio album by American rock band the Hooters, released in May 1985 by Columbia Records and on CBS Records in Europe. The album features two of the band's biggest and best-known hits, "And We Danced" and "Day by Day", as well as the minor hit, "All You Zombies", which was a rerecorded version of a single that had first been released in 1982.

Background
In the summer of 1983, guitarist Eric Bazilian and keyboard player Rob Hyman were invited by their old college friend and bandmate from Baby Grand, Rick Chertoff, to work on the debut album for a newly signed singer to Columbia Records named Cyndi Lauper. This resulted in The Hooters reforming after having broken up several months earlier. Eventually executives at Columbia Records, who were impressed by the over 100,000 copies that the band's independent album Amore had sold, as well as the local Philadelphia fan support (26 million entries in radio station WMMR's contest to win a Hooters show at a local high school) decided on July 26, 1984 at the Four Seasons Hotel in Philadelphia, to sign the Hooters to a multi-album contract to the company.

On July 13, 1985, The Hooters opened the Philadelphia segment of Live Aid, a concert event to raise funds to benefit Africa. This internationally televised event introduced the band to a global audience that subsequently translated to major commercial success. Their first major overseas tour came later that year when they played throughout Australia.

Different versions of three songs on Nervous Night — "All You Zombies", "Hanging on a Heartbeat" and "Blood from a Stone" — were originally released on the Hooters' independent album release Amore in 1983. "Blood From a Stone" had also been recently covered by Red Rockers and released as a single.

Eric Bazilian told Songfacts that "Day by Day" "was a song that started as an experiment with Rick Chertoff." He added that it took them  "2 years whipping it into shape."

Cash Box called the third single "Day by Day" a "straight ahead anthemlike track which chimes with a ringing chorus" that shows of the Hooters' "excellent use of dynamics and innate talent for penning hit songs full of melodic hooks."  Billboard said that it has "hard-driving energy and muscular mandolins."

Cash Box said that fourth single "Where Do the Children Go" was a "poignant ballad."

1986 film
An award-winning film starring the Hooters and directed by John Jopson, Nervous Night, was produced by Bell One Productions.  Nervous Night was shot on 35mm film and intercuts two separate elements: a concert filmed at the Tower Theater in Philadelphia, and a series of short films, each one starring a different band member.

Awards
Nervous Night achieved platinum certification status around the world, selling in excess of 2 million copies in the United States.

On September 5, 1986, The Hooters appeared on the 1986 MTV Video Music Awards, where they were nominated in the category of Best New Artist in a Video for "And We Danced". They performed two songs on the show, "And We Danced" and "Nervous Night".

Rolling Stone named The Hooters the Best New Band of the Year for 1986.

At Billboard's 8th Annual Video Music Conference on November 22, 1986, the film Nervous Night won two awards: Best Concert Performance for the "Where Do the Children Go" video and Best Long-Form Program.

The Hooters also placed in five categories in Billboards Top 100 of 1986:

 Top Pop Artist (No. 41)
 Top Pop Album (No. 23)
 Top Pop Album Artists/Groups (No. 16)
 Top Pop Album Artists based on one album (No. 27)
 Top Pop Singles Artists based on three singles (No. 3)

Track listing

Notes
 The album's title track did not appear on original LP releases of the album, or on the very first CDs. Originally a B-side to the "All You Zombies" single, it was included on all subsequent CD editions of the album as track 5.

Personnel
Credits adapted from the album liner notes.

The Hooters
Eric Bazilian – lead vocals (tracks 1-3, 5-7, 9-10), guitars, bass, mandolin, saxophone
Rob Hyman – lead vocals (tracks 1-4, 6-8), keyboards, melodica
Andy King – bass, vocals
John Lilley – guitar
David Uosikkinen – drums

Additional musicians
Patty Smyth – vocals on "Where Do the Children Go"

Technical
Rick Chertoff – producer
John Agnello – engineer
William Wittman – engineer, mixing (at Atlantic Studios)
Carol Cafiero – assistant engineer 
Dan Nash – assistant engineer
Dave Thoener – mixing ("And We Danced") (at Cherokee Studios)
George Marino – mastering (at Sterling Sound)
Joel Zimmerman – art direction, design 
Mark Chin – photography
Barbara Blair – production design

Charts

Certifications

References

External links
"Nervous Night" at discogs

1985 albums
The Hooters albums
Columbia Records albums
Albums produced by Rick Chertoff